Summerhall is an arts complex and events venue in Edinburgh, Scotland. Formerly home to the Royal (Dick) School of Veterinary Studies of the University of Edinburgh, it is now a major Edinburgh Festival Fringe visual and performing arts venue. It also hosts events for the Edinburgh Science Festival and Edinburgh International Magic Festival and provides a home for arts practitioners year round; its many rooms are used for art exhibitions, drama and music performances, libraries, small museums, educational & research programmes, artist studios, arts organisation offices, and workshops.

History
Early records show the Summerhall site being used by a family run brewery, which was established in the 1710s. All that remains of this brewery are a well and stone rubble sandstone boundary wall. Terraced houses and shops occupied the site for many years, until they made way for the purpose-built Royal (Dick) Veterinary College, when it moved from Clyde Street in the north of the city.

Building on the college began in 1913, and on 21 July 1914, a memorial stone and time capsule were laid underneath the grand entrance steps. Work ceased on the outbreak of the First World War, due to a lack of labour as young men joined the armed forces. The veterinary college moved to the site in 1916, and the college was based in the main building and wings to the rear courtyard.

The Anatomy Lecture Theatre, still extant, has wooden, curved, tiered seating and vaulted sky light. It is the last surviving example of this type of lecture theatre at veterinary colleges in the United Kingdom.

Elsewhere on the site, the space known as the "Tech Cube", at the corner of Summerhall Crescent and Hope Park Terrace, was originally the Hope Park United Presbyterian Church designed by famous Edinburgh architects Peddie and Mackay. It opened for worship in September 1867, and its spire could be seen from a large distance. The Hope Park Church Galleries were originally the Hope Park and Buccleuch Congregational Church, built in 1876 and designed to seat 730.

The veterinary college became a full faculty of the University of Edinburgh in 1964, and the school continued on the site until 2010, when the Royal Dick relocated to a new campus at Easter Bush in the south of the city. In November 2011, the former college buildings were acquired by the McDowell family, and developed under the direction of Robert McDowell as a multi-arts, and arts-related organization and business, centre. 

The Summerhall arts complex includes a bar and restaurant (The Royal Dick), a microbrewery (Barney's Beer) and the Pickering Gin distillery.

References

External links
Summerhall website

Buildings and structures in Edinburgh